The Cancionero de la Colombina or Cancionero Musical de la Colombina (CMC) is a Spanish manuscript (Ms. 7-1-28) containing Renaissance music from the second half of the 15th century.

The manuscript was copied during the reign of the Catholic Monarchs, possibly between the 1460s and the 1480s. Therefore, it predates the more famous Cancionero de Palacio. The first half of the manuscript is the work of two main scribes, and the second half was completed by six other scribes. It originally comprised 106 folios, 8 of which are lost. The general condition of the remaining folios is less than satisfactory. A title added on a later period reads "Cantilenas vulgares puestas en musica por varios Españoles" (Popular melodies set to music by various Spaniards).

The Cancionero de la Colombina has been related with the court of the powerful dukes of Medina Sidonia who lived in Seville and had contacts with Juan de Triana, the main composer of the manuscript.

In 1534 it was bought by the second son of Christopher Columbus, the bibliophile Ferdinand Columbus, who added it to his rich Sevillian library of more than 15,000 volumes known by the name of "Columbine Library" (in Spanish, "Biblioteca Colombina"). After his death, the library was transferred to the Seville Cathedral, where it remains up to this day.

The Cancionero currently contains 95 musical settings, some of which are incomplete. Of this total, 53 remain anonymous. The authorship of several works could be established because they had been properly attributed in other cancioneros, especially the Cancionero de Palacio and the Cancionero de Montecassino.

The repertory in the manuscript is varied. Among the musical genres can be found canciones, villancicos, romances and ensaladas. Many of the villancicos and canciones are sacred, mostly Marian. Two of the works are in French and 12 are liturgical compositions in Latin. There are also two short versions in Castilian of the Song of the Sibyl ("El Cant de la Sibil·la"), nos. 73 and 91 ("Juysio fuerte será dado").

List of works

Bibliography
Historia de la música española. Vol 2. Desde el Ars Nova hasta 1600. Samuel Rubio. Alianza Editorial. Madrid. 1983.
El cancionero musical de la Colombina (siglo XV). Transcripción y estudio por Miguel Querol Gavaldá. 2a ed. Madrid. 1989. Ministerio de Educación y Ciencia. Monumentos históricos de la música española Collection.
Anglés, Higinio. La música en la Corte de los Reyes Católicos. C.S.I.C. Madrid. 1960
Gómez Fernández, Lucía. Música, nobleza y mecenazgo: los duques de Medina Sidonia en Sevilla y Sanlúcar de Barrameda (1445-1615). Universidad de Cádiz. Cádiz. 2017.
Spanish Music in the Age of Columbus. Robert Louis Stevenson. Hyperion Pr. 1979. 0883558726
Sources, MS, §IX, 22: Renaissance polyphony: Spanish and Portuguese cathedral manuscripts. Grove Music Online.

References

External links 
Texts: https://web.archive.org/web/20090416113508/http://cancionerovirtual.liv.ac.uk/AnaServer?dutton+0+start.anv+ms=SV&sms=1
List of works: https://web.archive.org/web/20100202064340/http://saulbgroen.nl/pdf/r4.pdf

15th-century manuscripts
Chansonniers (books)
Spanish music history
Renaissance music
Renaissance music manuscript sources
Spanish music